Eli Smallwood House is a historic home located at New Bern, Craven County, North Carolina.  It was built about 1810, and is a -story, side-hall plan, Federal style brick town house.  It features hand carved ornaments on the main cornice, the porches, and the dormer. It was the home of Congressmen Charles R. Thomas (1827-1891) and his son Charles R. Thomas (1861–1931) from 1873 to 1925.

It was listed on the National Register of Historic Places in 1972.

References

External links

Historic American Buildings Survey in North Carolina
Houses on the National Register of Historic Places in North Carolina
Federal architecture in North Carolina
Houses completed in 1810
Houses in New Bern, North Carolina
National Register of Historic Places in Craven County, North Carolina